is an uninhabited island in Akkeshi, Hokkaidō, Japan. Of the island's 107 hectares, 64 are owned by the state, 42 by the municipality, and one is in private hands.

Environment
The island forms part of Akkeshi Prefectural Natural Park and its entire area of 107 hectares is a Special Wildlife Protection Area. It provides an important breeding ground for seabirds, in particular several hundred thousand Leach's storm petrel, as well as the tufted puffin, Japanese cormorant, pelagic cormorant, spectacled guillemot, slaty-backed gull, and rhinoceros auklet. Twelve hectares of the breeding grounds have been designated a Natural Monument. The island has been recognised as an Important Bird Area (IBA) by BirdLife International for its seabird colonies.

Also found on the island are the grey-sided vole and harbour seal. Trees include the green alder, painted maple, and Erman's birch; other plants, Sakhalin knotweed and Parasenecio hastatus.

References

See also

 List of Natural Monuments of Japan (Hokkaidō)
 Wildlife Protection Areas in Japan

Akkeshi, Hokkaido
Islands of Hokkaido
Important Bird Areas of Japan
Seabird colonies